William George Faulkner (born 5 May 1923) is an English former first-class cricketer.

While serving in the Royal Air Force, Faulkner made a single appearance in first-class cricket for the Royal Air Force against Worcestershire at Worcester in 1946.

Batting twice in that match, he was dismissed for 5 runs by Peter Jackson in the Royal Air Force first-innings, while in their second-innings he was dismissed by Leonard Blunt for 18 runs. With his right-arm fast-medium bowling, he bowled 24 wicketless overs.

References

External links

1923 births
Possibly living people
People from Bromley-by-Bow
Royal Air Force airmen
English cricketers
Royal Air Force cricketers
20th-century Royal Air Force personnel